Fuser may refer to:

 fuser (Unix), a Unix command which lists processes currently using given files, filesystems, or sockets
 Fuser (video game), a rhythm video game
 Diego Fuser, Italian footballer
 Fuser, the part of a laser printer that melts the toner onto the medium
 Fuser, a nickname for Ernesto "Che" Guevara de la Serna

See also
 Fusee (disambiguation)
 Fusor (disambiguation)
 Füzér, Borsod-Abaúj-Zemplén, Hungary